Don Pedro José Pidal y Carniado, 1st Marquis of Pidal (25 November 1799 – 28 December 1865) was a Spanish lawyer, writer, politician (alcalde, deputy and senator) and academician who served important political offices in the reign of Isabella II of Spain, including those of Minister of Gobernación (Interior minister), Minister of State (1848-1849 and 1856-8), Minister of Justice and Speaker (presidente) of the Congress of Deputies (1844-7).

Biography

Pedro José Pidal y Carniado was born in Villaviciosa, Asturias. On finishing his Law studies, he moved to Madrid in 1822 and started working for a prestigious law firm and collaborated with the short-lived daily El Espectador (1821-3), founded by his fellow Asturian liberal, Evaristo San Miguel.

Before becoming increasingly involved in politics, he briefly (c. 1841) held the Chair of History of Government and Legislation in Spain at the Ateneo de Madrid. He became an academician of the Real Academia Española in 1844, of the Real Academia de la Historia in 1847, and director of this institution in 1852.

Pidal Plan

Among the many other reforms carried out by Pidal as Minister of the Interior, the so-called Pidal Plan (1845) —the most important of a series of reforms in Spain's education system that would eventually lead to the so-called Ley Moyano (1857), which would remain in effect until 1970—, implemented the first major overhaul of Spain's education system. Actually drawn up by his friend Antonio Gil y Zárate, the plan called for state-run institutos to be created in each provincial capital and among the many aspects the plan introduced were modifications to the syllabus, with the subjects of Spanish literature introduced at secondary level and geography and Spanish history introduced for both secondary and university students. 

The plan also created the first chair in International Law, a post first held, albeit briefly, by Lorenzo Arrazola y García, a former Minister of Justice, future Prime Minister of Spain and President of the Supreme Court.

Family

His son, Alejandro Pidal y Mon (1846–1913) would also become a deputy (as well as Speaker of Congress) and academician (also being appointed director of the Real Academia Española). His grandson, Pedro Pidal Bernaldo de Quirós (1870–1941) would likewise enter politics, becoming both deputy and senador.

Notes

References

|-

|-

|-

Marquesses of Spain
Foreign ministers of Spain
Presidents of the Congress of Deputies (Spain)
Knights of the Golden Fleece of Spain
Members of the Royal Spanish Academy
1799 births
1865 deaths
Moderate Party (Spain) politicians
19th-century Spanish politicians